Manhattan is a commuter railroad station on Metra's SouthWest Service located in the town of Manhattan, Illinois. The station is the southern terminus of the line. The Manhattan station opened on January 30, 2006, as part of a southern extension of the SouthWest Service. It is the southernmost station of the entire Metra system. As of 2018, Manhattan is the 227th busiest of Metra's 236 non-downtown stations, with an average of 19 weekday boardings. The station's rank is tied with the neighboring Laraway Road station.

As of January 16, 2023, Manhattan is served by 10 trains (five in each direction) on weekdays. Three of the outbound trains that stop at the station make a flag stop to discharge all remaining passengers. All trains that serve Manhattan originate or terminate here. Saturday service is currently suspended.

Manhattan station consists of a station house and one platform serving a single track; the SouthWest Service operates on only one track from  southward.

Station layout

The Manhattan station consists of a single track and a single platform. The platform has an enclosed shelter that is open 24/7 but has no staffed ticket window. The single track is long enough to accommodate out-of-service trains, but due to the station's low train volume, most trains simply arrive and depart. One freight train, the Norfolk Southern Manhattan Local, runs on the track that splits off from the Manhattan station to the Manhattan Oil Refinery.

References

External links

Metra stations in Illinois
Railway stations in the United States opened in 2006
2006 establishments in Illinois
Railway stations in Will County, Illinois
Former Wabash Railroad stations
Railway stations in the United States opened in 1880
Railway stations closed in 1962